Robert Comtesse (14 August 1847, in Valangin – 17 November 1922) was a Swiss politician and member of the Swiss Federal Council (1899-1912).

He was elected to the Federal Council of Switzerland on 14 December 1899 and resigned on 4 March 1912. He was affiliated to the Free Democratic Party. 

While in office he held the following departments:
Department of Finance (1900)
Department of Justice and Police (1901)
Department of Posts and Railways (1902, 1912)
Department of Finance (1903, 1905–09, 1911)
Political Department as President of the Confederation (1904, 1911)

"Quai Robert-Comtesse" in Neuchâtel and "Rue Robert-Comtesse" in Cernier are named after Comtesse.

References

External links 

1847 births
1922 deaths
People from Val-de-Ruz District
Swiss Calvinist and Reformed Christians
Free Democratic Party of Switzerland politicians
Members of the Federal Council (Switzerland)
Finance ministers of Switzerland
Members of the National Council (Switzerland)
Presidents of the National Council (Switzerland)
University of Neuchâtel alumni
Foreign ministers of Switzerland